Capstick's Law is a British television drama series that originally aired in 1989. Produced by Granada Television for the ITV network, it centred on a firm of solicitors in the 1950s. The period drama used Russell Harty's old house in the village of Giggleswick, North Yorkshire, for filming.

Premise
Edward and Madge Capstick are a happily married solicitor and his wife.  The eldest son, Jonty, has just started his own practice.  Their youngest son, Tony, is articled in London.  It is May 1953.  Eight years have passed since the Second World War ended, but changes in society are appearing and the pace of change is threatening family life too.

Cast
 
William Gaunt as Edward Capstick
Wanda Ventham as Madge Capstick
Robin Ellis as Henry Capstick
Christopher Villiers as Jonty Capstick
Jason Carter as Timothy Harger
Georgia Byng as Vicky Colnay
Gordon Gostelow as Posh Mitton
Lesley Dunlop as Sarah Harger
Nick Stringer as Birtles
Roger Brierley as Ashton
Simon Cowell-Parker as Ralph Ashton
Madge Hindle as Mrs Birtles
Cyd Hayman as Lizette Colnay
Guy Scantlebury as Anthony Capstick
Bryan Pringle as Geoff Turnbull
Mary Healy as Myra Turnbull
Phyllis Calvert as Rachel Wilson
Liz Fraser as Florence Smith
Jackie Shinn as Posh's crony
Marlene Sidaway as Peggy
Geoffrey Leesley as Arnold Mapeley
Helen Anderson as Jess Birkett
David Roper as Harry Clifton
Lynda Rooke as Mrs Clifton
James Warrior as chairman
Bernard Kay as Birkett
William Ivory as Ramsden
David Fleeshman as Stanton
Clive Wood as Roger Maitland
Rachel James as Judy Maitland
Patsy Rowlands as Miss Foster
Janet Henfrey as Miss Price
June Ellis as Mrs Webley
Paul Chapman as Gilbert Clegg
Paul Ratcliffe as Harry
Helen Howard as Lynne
Frances Cox as landlady
Tommy Boyle as Jack Collins
Julie-Kate Olivier as Pat Schofield
Michael Hughes as Supt Meadows
Martin Benson as maitre d'hotel

References

External links

Stills from the TV series

1989 British television series debuts
1989 British television series endings
1980s British drama television series
1980s British television miniseries
ITV television dramas
English-language television shows
Television series by ITV Studios
Television series set in the 1950s
Television shows set in Yorkshire
Television shows produced by Granada Television
1980s British legal television series